South Sudan News Agency (SSNA) is an independent English-language online newspaper covering news about South Sudan and other African countries, headquartered in the United States. SSNA News is the news division of the South Sudan News Agency. The SSNA was founded in 2008 and launched in 2010. The South Sudan News Agency features authors and scholars from South Sudan and other regions around the world.

See also
 Media of South Sudan

References

External links
 South Sudan News Agency
Sudan, South Sudan, East Africa, Africa, News Websites